The 1947–48 İstanbul Football League season was the 40th season of the league. Fenerbahçe SK won the league for the 12th time.

Season

References

Istanbul Football League seasons
Turkey
2